Bare Island is a heritage-listed islet located in the Eastern Suburbs of Sydney, in La Perouse in the City of Randwick local government area in the state of New South Wales, in eastern Australia. Containing former fortification facilities, Bare Island was a former war veterans' home and museum and is now a historic site that was added to the New South Wales State Heritage Register on 2 April 1999 and is significant as an almost completely intact example of late nineteenth century coastal defence technology. It was designed by Sir Peter Scratchley, Gustave Morell and James Barnet and built from 1881 to 1889 by John McLeod on behalf of the NSW Department of Public Works.

Bare Island is connected by a footbridge to the mainland of La Perouse. The heritage-listed military fort and tunnels can only be visited by guided tour. The waters around the island are popular with scuba divers. The Bare Island anglerfish is named after this island.

History
At European contact the Gweagal and Kameygal Aboriginal groups were associated with Bare Island. It is mentioned in the journals of both Joseph Banks and James Cook. Banks collected shell specimens there, while Cook noted that the island described as "a small bare island" provided a convenient navigational marker. The name stuck from this first usage. As such the name is one of the first European names for a part of the east coast.

Governor Phillip and French explorer Jean-Francois de La Perouse were the next to enter Botany Bay, but neither group is known to have visited Bare Island. The French built a stockade and (kitchen) garden nearby ( from the Macquarie Tower) towards Frenchmans Bay and buried their dead, Father (Pere) Receveur.

William Bradley, in his journal "A Voyage to New South Wales", relates that in July 1788 noticeboards were erected on the island to advise visiting ships that the settlement had moved to Port Jackson.

The area was considered remote from Sydney and as the nineteenth century progressed became the focus of noxious trades such as tanneries and fell-mongering as well as the development of a unique Aboriginal community at La Perouse which serviced the diverse tastes of urban Sydney. The removal of all remaining garrison troops from Australian colonies excepting those retained and paid for by colonial governments as a result of the Cardwell reforms in the late 1860s forced a rethink of local defence preparedness, especially with the outbreak of hostilities between Russia and Britain in 1876. As a result, the Australian colonies requested the services of an Imperial Engineer to advise them on defence matters. Military engineers Scratchley and Jervois were sent.

Fortification facilities
Jervois recommended a small work in Botany Bay as protection from small squadrons of hostile cruisers making lightning raids on Sydney and holding it to ransom for its gold reserves. Scratchley was responsible for turning Jervois's strategic vision into a detailed design and specification of the works. This he did with the aid of civil engineer Gustavus Morell. The specifications were also developed with the aid of the Colonial Architect James Barnet who was responsible for its construction. Construction of Bare Island fort was completed in 1885 at a cost of A£34,000; work inside the fort began in 1889.

Bare Island Fort reflects the development of coastal fortifications design by the British Army, from locations around the world over more than a century. This was combined with a newly generated understanding of ballistics and materials science that was a product of the late nineteenth century Industrial Revolution. Bare Island, in comparison to earlier coastal defences constructed in Australia, such as Fort Denison or the Middle Head Batteries, shows the impact of new materials such as concrete, as well as the ever-increasing power of guns.

The design and construction was complex. The basis of the design was a symmetrical crescent, with the heaviest gun in the centre, which faced the likely line of attack. The various stages in the design of Bare Island took from mid 1877 to early 1880 when the final design was specified and contracted out. Even then, Scratchley still did not consider the design complete and regularly made alterations and suggestions, some verbally and some in writing.

Plans for a fort were drawn up by the Colonial Architect's department, and government tender for construction was awarded to a building company led by John McLeod, who also built the Georges Head and Middle Head fortifications. McLeod won the tender in 1881 and commenced work on 7 April. His work was supervised by Public Works Department Clerk of Works Henry Purkis who was responsible for many other projects which called him away from Bare Island for extended periods. Following Scratchley's death in 1885 overall supervision of the project was delegated to Major Penrose.

Construction was completed in 1886, but by 1887 problems began to emerge as a result of poor construction. Between 1888 and 1889 barracks were constructed using the same contractor. The job did not go to tender. Lieutenant Colonel De Wolski raised questions as to the appropriateness of the barracks design and location, as well as the fact that tenders had not been called for its construction. A Board of Inquiry was established to investigate his concerns, but work continued. De Wolski complained and the work and contract were suspended. The fort was armed with two RML 9 inch 12 ton guns, two RML 80 pounder guns, a RML 10 inch 18 ton gun in an armoured casemate, and two fivebarreled  Nordenfelt guns.

At the same time, a Royal Commission of Inquiry was established into the contract and construction of Bare Island. This inquiry found that the Colonial Architect Barnet was responsible for the mismanagement of works at Bare Island. This finding and the controversy surrounding it led to Barnet's premature retirement from public life. McLeod was never awarded another government tender and Barnet resigned from his position around that time too. The bridge to the island was added in 1887. Until then, access relied on a flying fox (zip line), or a barge. It was by barge that the five major guns on the island – including a 12 tonne cannon – were brought across. During its operating years, the barracks were manned by about 70 soldiers. Bare Island was transferred to the Commonwealth in 1901. The garrison was reduced in 1902 and by 1908 it does not appear that any substantial military activity was occurring there.

War veterans' home
In the early 1900s the fort was decommissioned and soon after it became the first war veterans' home in Australia. After petitioning from local women's groups, in 1912 the first seven war veterans moved in. Between 1912 and 1963 the island was used as a war veterans home, except during World War 2 when it was again used for military purposes.

In the 1930s the guns on the island were sold (for scrap metal, during the Depression) but the larger two were left on the island, because they were too heavy to be brought back across the bridge.

The army took over the fort in 1942 when Japan entered World War 2 and the veterans made way for 24 servicemen known as the "Bare section". In 1962 the army offered to sell the island to the War Veterans' Home for a fee of one pound, but the offer was declined. It continued to operate as a retirement home until 1963, when Randwick Historical Society became caretakers of the island.

Use as a museum
The island was notified as a Reserve for Public Recreation on 12 March 1965. Between 1963 and 1967 Randwick Historical Society controlled Bare Island and carried out works. They also involved other groups such as the Fort Artillery Society who wore period costumes and conducted live firings of the 9 inch gun. These were very popular and became established as a regular attraction.

Bare Island Historic Site was gazetted 1 October 1967 under the care of NSW National Parks and Wildlife Service (NPWS), although the Randwick Historical Society continued to maintain their museum and its associated activities. The live firings were stopped in 1974.

The fort was open to the public until 28 December 1989, the day of the earthquake in Newcastle.

The current use of the island by NPWS is for interpretation through guided tours (see endorsed conservation plan, 1997).

Ranwick City Council is finalising a move to lease the La Perouse museum precinct from the NPWS. The area council will take over includes the former La Perouse former cable station (now the museum, pictured) and historic structures including the Macquarie Watchtower, the La Perouse Monument and the Pere Receveur Tomb. NPWS deputy chief executive Michael Wright said the change would lead to an improvement in facilities, which would attract more visitors and also provide better access for people to explore the area. The Bare Island fort has since been declared an historic site. The site is open to guided tours, available most Sundays.

Popular culture
Bare Island was featured in Mission: Impossible 2, East West 101, and the finale of Netflix’ reboot of The Mole.

Description 
The island has been completely altered from its natural profile. The fortification complex comprises the battery, barracks buildings, parade and courtyard, access bridge and laboratory room/guards quarters. The fabric of the complex is best described in relation to the 6 phases of occupation identified by Gojak:

Phase I, 18801890 Original fortification works by McLeod
Includes all major concrete work and earthworks, the bridge, original space functions and finishes. Characteristic materials are mass concrete with sandstone aggregate, cement render, cream fired brick, checker pattern salt-glazed tiles under asphalt, some reinforcing, armour plate, use of vaulting to span tunnels and much of the timber detailing.
see endorsed conservation plan, 1997

Phase II, 18901912 Second phase fortification works by de Wolski and others, primarily before 1895
Includes mainly the Barracks and the installation of a hydro-pneumatic gun and stores. Characteristic materials include concrete with finer bluestone aggregate, reinforcing beams to span voids, some conduit, red tuckpoint brickwork with dressed sandstone quoins and lintels, some paint finishes.

Phase III, 19121963 War Veterans Home, primarily around 1912, then a second phase of activity in 1939
Includes minor modifications in all areas of the Fort. Characteristic materials include paint finishes, timber flooring inside store rooms, some conduits and cabling, alterations to original use of spaces and installation or removal of internal walls. Changes also made to Barracks with opening up of new access passages, and circulation routes.

Phase IV, 19411945 World War II military usage
No definite evidence of this period beyond possible painted signage.

Phase V, 1963 Randwick Historical Society Museum; includes the period when Museum was in operation, both before and after NPWS ownership
Characteristic evidence includes reinstatement and reproduction of original features by removal of later material, mainly War Veterans period, or addition of material to a presumed original form, also some repairs, paint finishes, resurfacing of floors, especially in Caretakers area in the lower floor of the Barracks building.

Phase VI, 1975present NPWS administration
All changes made since Randwick Historical Society vacated island. Mainly constitutes large scale repair and conservation work to retaining walls, Barracks verandah, roof of casemate, drainage system, removal of more recent additions and provision of safety works.

Recreation
Bare Island is the most popular scuba diving site in New South Wales. On a sunny summer Sunday there can be as many as 200 divers here during the day. It is a common diver training location and also very popular for snorkeling.

The reefs that stretch around the island and out to the south and west are home to some of Australia's most colourful marine animals. Things to be seen include big belly sea horses, sea dragons, pygmy pipehorses, red Indian fish and all the usual fish seen around Sydney. People have also seen seals and grey nurse sharks at times and in late winter Port Jackson sharks are very common.

Condition 

As at 14 December 2000, the archaeological potential to reveal information not available from other sources about the construction and use of the Fort is high, as is the potential to derive information that cannot be found on other sites. Intactness is high. The structure retains enough of the original fabric to enable its form, functions and interrelationships to be easily established. The integrity of the complex is high. Most facets of the structure and its functions survive.

Modifications and dates 
1985 to 1987 – Bridge repair
1993 – Structural repairs
1997 – Major conservation works including waterproofing

Heritage listing 
As at 18 May 2010, Bare Island is nationally significant as an almost completely intact example of late nineteenth century coastal defence technology. Designed by Sir Peter Scratchley to a specification by William Jervoise, it represents one of the more substantial and impressive of the many fortifications built around Australasia. The Fort reflects the evolution of the relationship between New South Wales as an increasingly independent colony and Britain. It shows the way that strategic defence policy was operating in Australia on the eve of Federation. The Fort is also nationally significant as the site of the first War Veterans Home founded in Australia. This reflects the social and moral obligations felt by Australians early this century to the veterans of wars fought across the British Empire. It is an early major construction from mass concrete, at a time when the use of this material was still uncommon and not well understood. The Fort is of State significance for its pivotal role in the closure of the career of James Barnet, NSW Colonial Architect. It has significant impacts on the way publicly funded construction was carried out in New South Wales after that time. The Fort is regionally significant as the only island in Botany Bay. The form of the island has been changed by the construction of the Fort, to present a functional structure which nonetheless is of high aesthetic value. It is an important example of fortification design which demonstrates the evolution of the theory of coastal defence, the technology of defence and coastal fortification design. The Fort is regionally significant to the general community as part of the recreational and historic landscape of Botany Bay. Bare Island has particular local significance to the La Perouse community as an item of local heritage value.

Bare Island Fort was listed on the New South Wales State Heritage Register on 2 April 1999 having satisfied the following criteria.

The place is important in demonstrating the course, or pattern, of cultural or natural history in New South Wales.

Bare Island Fort is historically significant at national and state levels. It represents processes of national development and strategic defence policy that helped to shape the modern Australian nation, it played a pivotal role in the career of the last Colonial Architect and affected the nature of public administration in New South Wales. It was the site for the first War Veterans Home in Australia

The place is important in demonstrating aesthetic characteristics and/or a high degree of creative or technical achievement in New South Wales.

Bare Island can be characterised as a low monolith extending along the line of La Perouse Headland. The scale of the works, their colouring and placement emphasises the rounded shape of the island, and is within the scale of the island's original size. The concrete works increase in density with elevation, presenting an impression of organic growth from natural bedrock at the bottom to solid concrete at the highest point. This also serves to enhance the feeling of solidity of the construction.

The earliest views of Bare Island emphasised it as a small rugged island, and the current form of the island still permits an understanding of the island's original size and shape. Once it became fortified and connected by a bridge to the mainland it remained a popular object for photography, with most photographs of the island either emphasising the western face with large expanses of concrete and loopholed walls, or the view down the bridge towards the jumble of concrete, rocks and grass.

As a coastal fortification the design and organisation of the Fort is typical of others built around the British Empire in the 1870s and 1880s. It uses the flexibility of mass concrete to create massive but sinuous curved shapes, and a complex juxtaposition of straight lines and curved forms on differing levels. These are functional spaces and lines, linking the circular gun emplacements, and the curving gun passage with the regularity of the Barracks and loopholed rear walls. In plan the Fort is essentially symmetrical, in two main levels, accessed by ramps and stairs. The view from seaward, to the east, is primarily of natural surfaces and contouring, with few hard lines except for the casemate gun shield. The predominant features that create Bare Island are low relief, a juxtaposition of natural and concrete surfaces, scale and mass. Bare Island is significant as the only island in Botany Bay. The construction of the form is aesthetically pleasing for its close relationship and integration with the natural island landform with the built form. The visible built work provides an indication of the massiveness of the concealed construction. It is a nationally representative example of the corpus of significant designers of fortifications – Jervoise and Scratchley, a regionally representative example that demonstrates fortification design in the late 19th century, and regionally representative as an example in the evolution of the design of coastal fortifications.

The place has a strong or special association with a particular community or cultural group in New South Wales for social, cultural or spiritual reasons.

Bare Island is significant to a number of well-defined groups either as a discrete entity or as part of a broader social setting. Bare Island has significance as part of the land used and exploited by members of the La Perouse Aboriginal community over the past century. This includes the use of the beaches and surrounding waters for food gathering, work and recreation, the relationships formed with soldiers stationed on the island and with the veterans, and as part of the social landscape of the community. It also has an added association with Cook, Banks, Phillip and La Perouse and therefore represents for the wider Aboriginal community a significant contact point in the history of European – Aboriginal relationships.

For the mainstream Australian community the prevailing importance of Bare Island is its identification as a nineteenth-century fortification. This includes associations with the British Empire, the fear of attack by foreign powers and Australian insularity. The Fort is seen as a reminder that the world was different in the past and that there has been palpable change in the relationships between Australia and the rest of the world. These are an outgrowth of feelings in the community earlier this century and last century relating to the ambivalent relationship over ties with England, and to what extent Australians were part of the Empire or separate people. The perceived continuity is demonstrated by the use of the Fort as a War Veterans Home, strengthening the ties to the imperial bond. The Sydney community and particularly residents of Randwick Municipality and the Randwick and District Historical Society take an active interest in the management and future of the Fort.

Summary
Bare Island is an important place for the local and regional community, as a landscape item, as part of the remembered recreational landscape of Botany Bay and La Perouse and for its recognised historical importance. It has particular importance to the residents of La Perouse, including the local Aboriginal community.

The place has potential to yield information that will contribute to an understanding of the cultural or natural history of New South Wales.

Bare Island Fort is nationally rare as an early example of concrete construction, regionally representative as a demonstration of the technology of coastal artillery, fortification design and military tactics in the late 19th century, of high archaeological potential to reveal information not available from other sources about the construction and use of the Fort, of high significance for its potential to derive information that cannot be found on other sites, of medium to high significance for its ability to address pertinent research questions, and of low significance for the potential of its subsurface archaeological remains.

The place possesses uncommon, rare or endangered aspects of the cultural or natural history of New South Wales.

Bare Island is an example of early major construction from mass concrete at a time when use of this material was still uncommon and not well understood. Rare – Regional.

The place is important in demonstrating the principal characteristics of a class of cultural or natural places/environments in New South Wales.

This is a representative example of fortification design which demonstrates the evolution of theory of coastal defence, the technology of defence and coastal fortification design.

Gallery

See also

 List of islands of New South Wales
 Henry Head Battery
 Military history of Australia

References

Bibliography

Attribution

External links

 http://members.tripod.com/~coastalgunner/index.html
 Bare Island – Sydney.com

Islands of New South Wales
Forts in New South Wales
Botany Bay
James Barnet buildings in Sydney
New South Wales State Heritage Register
La Perouse, New South Wales
Veterans' homes
Military installations in New South Wales
Houses in New South Wales
Museums in New South Wales
Articles incorporating text from the New South Wales State Heritage Register